Alaska Highway is a 1943 American drama film directed by Frank McDonald and starring Richard Arlen, Jean Parker, and Ralph Sanford.

Plot
In February 1942 a road construction gang working in Northern California are summoned to a meeting.  The boss of the gang, Pop Ormsby, has been commissioned as a Major in the US Army Corps of Engineers and signs up the entire crew with his two sons, Woody and Steve, gaining direct entry as Technical Sergeants to build the Alcan Highway.

Woody wants to enlist in the US Marine Corps to fight the Japanese rather than build another road.  He changes his mind when he meets Ann, the daughter of one of the heads of the project, Blair, with the two brothers fighting over her as they build the highway.

Their feud is forgotten when a fire breaks out.

Cast 
Richard Arlen as Woody Ormsby
Jean Parker as Ann Coswell
Ralph Sanford as Frosty Gimble
William Henry as Steve Ormsby
Joe Sawyer as Roughhouse
Eddie Quillan as Pompadour "Shorty" Jones
Jack Wegman as Sergeant Swithers
Harry Shannon as John "Pop" Ormsby
Edward Earle as Blair Caswell
Keith Richards as Hank Lincoln

Production
The script was written in December, when Pine-Thomas renewed their deal with Paramount.  At one stage William C. Thomas was going to direct the film.

Pine-Thomas based their film's headquarters in Reno. Filming took place in the Chilkoot Mountains. Filming started 4 January 1943. Release of the film was sped up to take advantage of the Invasion of Attu.

References

External links 

Alaska Highway at BFI

Review of film at Variety

1943 films
American black-and-white films
1940s drama road movies
American drama road movies
Films set in Alaska
Paramount Pictures films
Films directed by Frank McDonald
Films scored by Freddie Rich
World War II films made in wartime
1943 drama films
1940s English-language films